Cleo "Baldy" Benson (November 15, 1913 – February 20, 1978) was a baseball catcher in the Negro leagues. He played with the Chicago American Giants in 1942. He later managed the San Francisco Sea Lions beginning in 1946.

References

External links
 and Seamheads 

Chicago American Giants players
1913 births
1978 deaths
Baseball players from Oklahoma
Baseball catchers